Battle 7 was a professional wrestling event produced by New Japan Pro-Wrestling (NJPW) that took place on January 4, 1995 in the Tokyo Dome. Battle 7 was the fourth January 4 Tokyo Dome Show held by NJPW. The show drew 52,500 spectators and $4,800,000 in ticket sales.

Besides NJPW wrestlers, the show also featured Sting from World Championship Wrestling (WCW) and former WCW stars The Steiner Brothers (Rick Steiner and Scott Steiner), as well as freelance wrestlers Tiger Jeet Singh and Tiger Jeet Singh, Jr. The show featured a four-man  "Final Countdown BVD" tournament, named after NJPW sponsor BVD.

The 1995 show marked the first time a non-NJPW or WCW title was defended, Shinjiro Otani defending the UWA World Welterweight Championship (originated in the Mexican Universal Wrestling Association) against El Samurai.

Production

Storylines
Battle 7 featured professional wrestling matches that involved different wrestlers from pre-existing scripted feuds and storylines. Wrestlers portrayed villains, heroes, or less distinguishable characters in scripted events that built tension and culminated in a wrestling match or series of matches.

Results

Final Countdown BVD tournament bracket

References

External links
NJPW.co.jp 

1995 in professional wrestling
1995 in Tokyo
Battle 7
January 1995 events in Asia